The IBM Association of Tennis Professionals (ATP) Tour is the elite tour for professional tennis organized by the ATP tour. The IBM ATP Tour includes the Grand Slam tournaments (organized by the International Tennis Federation, ITF), the ATP Super 9, the ATP Championship Series, the ATP World Series, the ATP World Team Cup, the Davis Cup (organized by the ITF), the ATP Tour World Championships and the Grand Slam Cup (organized by the ITF).

Schedule 
This is the complete schedule of events on the 1992 IBM ATP Tour, with player progression documented from the quarterfinals stage.
Key

January

February

March

April

May

June

July

August

September

October

November

December

ATP rankings

Statistical information 
List of players and titles won, alphabetically by last name:

  Andre Agassi - Atlanta, Wimbledon, Canada Masters (3)
  Jordi Arrese - Athens (1)
  Carsten Arriens - Guarujá (1)
  Boris Becker - Brussels, Rotterdam, Basel, Paris Masters, Season-Ending Championships (5)
  Sergi Bruguera - Madrid, Gstaad, Palermo (3)
  Omar Camporese - Milan (1)
  Tomás Carbonell - Maceio (1)
  Michael Chang - San Francisco, Indian Wells Masters, Miami Masters (3)
  Carlos Costa - Estoril, Barcelona (2)
  Jim Courier - Australian Open, Tokyo, Hong Kong, Rome Masters, French Open (5)
  Stefan Edberg - Hamburg Masters, New Haven, US Open (3)
  Jacco Eltingh - Manchester (1)
  Thomas Enqvist - Bolzano (1)
  Wayne Ferreira - London, Schenectady (2)
  Guy Forget - Toulouse (1)
  Jim Grabb - Taipei (1)
  Magnus Gustafsson - Båstad (1)
  Goran Ivanišević - Adelaide, Stuttgart, Sydney Indoors, Stockholm Masters (4)
  Bernd Karbacher - Cologne (1)
  Petr Korda - Washington, D.C., Long Island, Vienna (3)
  Richard Krajicek - Los Angeles, Antwerp (2)
  Aaron Krickstein - Johannesburg (1)
  Magnus Larsson - Copenhagen, Munich (2)
  Ivan Lendl - Tokyo Indoors (1)
  Gabriel Markus - Nice (1)
  Shuzo Matsuoka - Seoul (1)
  Luiz Mattar - São Paulo (1)
  Andrei Medvedev - Genova, Stuttgart, Bordeaux (3)
  Thomas Muster - Monte Carlo Masters, Florence, Umag (3)
  Karel Nováček - Hilversum, San Marino, Prague (3)
  Jaime Oncins - Bologna, Búzios (2)
  Guillermo Pérez Roldán - Casablanca (1)
  Stefano Pescosolido - Scottsdale (1)
  Guillaume Raoux - Brisbane (1)
  Marc Rosset - Barcelona Olympics, Moscow (2)
  Pete Sampras - Philadelphia, Kitzbühel, Cincinnati Masters, Indianapolis, Lyon (5)
  Emilio Sánchez - Sydney (1)
  Bryan Shelton - Newport (1)
  Michael Stich - Rosmalen, Grand Slam Cup (2)
  Jeff Tarango - Wellington, Tel Aviv (2)
  MaliVai Washington - Memphis, Charlotte (2)
  Simon Youl - Singapore (1)
  Jaime Yzaga - Auckland, Tampa (2)

The following players won their first title:
  Carsten Arriens
  Tomás Carbonell
  Carlos Costa
  Jacco Eltingh
  Thomas Enqvist
  Wayne Ferreira
  Bernd Karbacher
  Gabriel Markus
  Shuzo Matsuoka
  Andrei Medvedev
  Jaime Oncins
  Stefano Pescosolido
  Guillaume Raoux
  Jeff Tarango
  MaliVai Washington

See also 
 1992 WTA Tour

External links 
 1992 ATP Results Archive
 History Men's Professional Tours

 
Atp Tour
ATP Tour seasons